Mongoloid refers to an outdated historical grouping of various people indigenous to East Asia, Central Asia, Southeast Asia, North Asia, Polynesia, and the Americas.

Mongoloid may also refer to:

 Mongoloid idiot, previously used to refer to a person with Down syndrome – now a pejorative term
 Mongoloid languages, another name for the Sino-Tibetan languages
 "Mongoloid" (song) (1977), Devo's first single

See also 
 Mongoloid fold, a skin fold of the upper eyelid
 Mong (disambiguation)
 Mongo (disambiguation)
 Mongolism (disambiguation)